The Gypsy Camp Historic District encompasses a former summer camp facility in rural southwestern Benton County, Arkansas. The camp facilities were built in the 1920s for a girls summer camp, and are believed to be the only facilities built for that purpose in the state. The camp includes four cabins for campers, a dining/recreation hall, and three residential structures. All are finished with either pine slats or board-and-batten siding. There is a centrally-located rock arbor and wall that provide an outside seating area. The camp operated from 1921 to 1978.

The camp was listed on the National Register of Historic Places in 1988.

In 2018, the site was purchased and now operates as Gypsy Camp & Canoe.

Gallery

References

National Register of Historic Places in Arkansas
Buildings and structures completed in 1921
Historic districts in Benton County, Arkansas
Buildings and structures in Siloam Springs, Arkansas
National Register of Historic Places in Benton County, Arkansas
Temporary populated places on the National Register of Historic Places